Vena comitans is Latin for accompanying vein and is also known as a satellite vein.  It refers to a vein that is usually paired, with both veins lying on the sides of an artery. They are found in close proximity to arteries so that the pulsations of the artery aid venous return.  Because they are generally found in pairs, they are often referred to by their plural form: venae comitantes.

Venae comitantes are usually found with certain smaller arteries, especially those in the extremities.  Larger arteries, on the other hand, generally do not have venae comitantes.  They usually have a single, similarly sized vein which is not as intimately associated with the artery.

Examples
Examples of arteries and their venae comitantes:
 Radial artery and radial veins
 Ulnar artery and ulnar veins
 Brachial artery and brachial veins
 Anterior tibial artery and anterior tibial veins
 Posterior tibial artery and posterior tibial veins
 Fibular artery and fibular veins

Examples of arteries that do not have venae comitantes (i.e. those that have "regular" veins):
 Axillary artery and the axillary vein
 Subclavian artery and the subclavian vein

References

External links
 
 Photo of Venae comitantes of the brachial artery

Human anatomy